Bekahdan (also Romanized as Bekahdān; also known as Bekdūn and Qeshlāq) is a village in Aliabad-e Malek Rural District, in the Central District of Arsanjan County, Fars Province, Iran. At the 2006 census, its population was 817, in 190 families.

References 

Populated places in Arsanjan County